Keshab Ram Borah Higher Secondary School is an educational institute in the middle part of  Majuli, (Madhya Majuli) Jorhat, Assam, India. It has both the high (from class VIII to class X) and Middle English (from class V to class VII) section. Both the Keshab Ram Borah Higher Secondary School and Gereki Janajati Middle English School are situated in the same campus with a single school building.

Campus
There is a big playground in front of the school-building where outdoor games are held. The campus is surrounded by paddy fields on three sides. A vocational school is on the campus.

The campus is used almost every year to hold Bihu Xonmilon (stage bihu competition) and Bohagi bidai (farewell to bohag month or rongali bihu) during the Rongali Bihu by the local cultural committees.

Academic instruction

Subjects and Medium
The medium of teaching is Assamese, but students can take classes in English also. The following subjects are there for both the High and M.E. section. The Hindi, History and Geography are Elective Subjects and students have to opt for any one of them.
 Assamese
 English
 Hindi
 Mathematics
 General Science
 Social studies
 History
 Geography
 Drawing
 Handicraft

Academic session
The academic session starts from January to December. After the completion of six months a Half Yearly Examination is conducted. Then in the end of the year the Annual Examination is commenced. Every class teacher takes a Unit Test on their subject throughout the year.

Summer classes
This is an initiative taken by the regional  AASU committee to offer free coaching classes to the students during the summer vacation period. Students from other schools of the locality also can join these summer classes.

Student life
The students have a Union which is the general body of the students of the School.

Uniform
For boys navy blue pents and sky blue shirts. For girls, in the M.E. section, navy blue skirts and sky blue tops and in the High section  mekhela chador, mekhela being white and chador being white with navy blue edge. Students wear a school-badge.

Events
Annual events celebrated by the school include Republic Day, Independence Day, Teachers' Day, Saraswati pooja, the eve of the summer vacation and other regional/national festivals.

During the annual sports week students play cricket, football, volleyball, kabaddi, running, relay race, shot put, javelin, discus, long jump, high jump, triple jump, Ludo, chess, carrom, musical chairs, skipping, debate,  Oratory, creative writing, poetry recitation, music and drama.

See also
List of educational institutes in Majuli
List of villages in Majuli

References

External links
Assam General Knowledge, Page 52

High schools and secondary schools in Assam
Majuli
Educational institutions in India with year of establishment missing